The Thyra is a  river of Saxony-Anhalt, Germany, in the district of Mansfeld-Südharz in the Harz Mountains.

Course  
The Thyra begins its course in the old quarter of Stolberg in the Harz Mountains at the confluence of three mountain streams - the Große Wilde, Kleine Wilde and Lude - and then flows through Stolberg, where several streams join it, before heading south through a steep valley to Rottleberode. Here the Thyra valley becomes very wide, but near Uftrungen it narrows again. South of Uftrungen the Thyra leaves the Harz and enters the Goldene Aue, crossing  and Berga, before this little river enters the Helme.

Influence 
Several things are named after the Thyra, for example the Thyra thermal baths (Thyratherme) in Stolberg or the railway line known as the Thyraliesel.

See also 
List of rivers of Saxony-Anhalt

References

External links 

Mansfeld-Südharz
Rivers of Saxony-Anhalt
Rivers of Germany